This is a list of tennis players who have represented the Canada Fed Cup team in an official Fed Cup match. Canada have taken part in the competition since 1963.

Fed Cup players

*Active players in bold, statistics as of September 9, 2019

References

Canada
Fed
Fed Cup
Fed